Robert Keith Alexander (July 23, 1930 – November 12, 2014) was a provincial level politician from Alberta, Canada. He served as a member of the Legislative Assembly of Alberta from 1982 to 1985.

Political career
Alexander ran for a seat in the Alberta Legislature in the 1982 Alberta general election. He won the electoral district of Edmonton-Whitemud with a landslide victory to hold it for the governing Progressive Conservative party. He resigned his seat on November 5, 1985 so that Premier Don Getty could run in a by-election to have a seat in the legislature. He died on November 12, 2014, one day after the death of his wife, Vanessa.

References

External links
Legislative Assembly of Alberta Members Listing

Progressive Conservative Association of Alberta MLAs
2014 deaths
1930 births